MNPP may refer to:
Mongolian National Progress Party
El Papalonal Airport (ICAO code: MNPP)
Migrating Native Peoples Program; see Native Friendship Centre